The women's K-4 500 metres sprint canoeing competition at the 2002 Asian Games in Busan was held on 12 October at the Nakdong River.

Schedule
All times are Korea Standard Time (UTC+09:00)

Results

References 

2002 Asian Games Official Reports, Page 356
Results

External links 
Official Website

Women's K-4 500 metres